Paul Chaplet (born 18 April 1999) is a Costa Rican amateur golfer who is best known for winning the 2016 Latin America Amateur Championship.

Chaplet was first introduced to golf at the age of 10.

Chaplet recorded rounds of 83-82 and missed the cut in the 2016 Masters Tournament.

Amateur wins
2014 Costa Rica National Junior
2015 Costa Rica National Junior
2016 Latin America Amateur Championship
2017 Cameonato Sudamericano Amateur, Central American Championship
Source:

College Career

Sam Houston State University

2020-21

Named 2021 Southland Conference Co-Golfer of the year. Won the Individual Medalist honors at the 2021 Southland Conference Championship. First collegiate win came at the Bayou City Collegiate Classic.

Finished 26th at the NCAA Stillwater Regional, helping the Bearkats to fourth place finish and first trip to NCAA Championships in program history. 

Arizona State

2017-2020
 
Played in 14 events for the Sun Devils

Team appearances
Amateur
Eisenhower Trophy (representing Costa Rica): 2016, 2018, 2022

References

Costa Rican male golfers
Amateur golfers
Golfers at the 2019 Pan American Games
Pan American Games competitors for Costa Rica
Sportspeople from San José, Costa Rica
1999 births
Living people